Jana Novotná and Arantxa Sánchez Vicario were the defending champions but did not compete that year.

Meredith McGrath and Larisa Savchenko won in the final 6–2, 7–6 against Manon Bollegraf and Rennae Stubbs.

Seeds
Champion seeds are indicated in bold text while text in italics indicates the round in which those seeds were eliminated.

 Meredith McGrath /  Larisa Savchenko (champions)
 Manon Bollegraf /  Rennae Stubbs (final)
 Nicole Arendt /  Laura Golarsa (quarterfinals)
 Katrina Adams /  Zina Garrison-Jackson (semifinals)

Draw

External links
 1995 World Doubles Cup Draw

WTA Doubles Championships
1995 WTA Tour